Ana Carolina Amorim Taleska (born 1 April 1983 in Blumenau, Santa Catarina) is a Brazilian handball player who was most recently under contract with Alcoa FKC.

She was born as the older sister of Eduarda Amorim. She participated at the 2004 Summer Olympics in Athens, where the Brazilian team placed seventh. At the time she played club handball for Kometal Skopje in Macedonia.

References

1983 births
Living people
People from Blumenau
Brazilian female handball players
Handball players at the 2004 Summer Olympics
Olympic handball players of Brazil
Expatriate handball players
Brazilian expatriate sportspeople in North Macedonia
Brazilian expatriate sportspeople in Hungary
Fehérvár KC players
Sportspeople from Santa Catarina (state)
21st-century Brazilian women